Bradford is an unincorporated community located in Bracken County, Kentucky, United States.

History
An early variant name was Metcalfe's Landing. A post office called Metcalfe's Landing was established in 1863, the name was changed to Bradford in 1866, and the post office closed in 1956. The present name honors Laban J. Bradford, a local businessman.

References

Unincorporated communities in Bracken County, Kentucky
Unincorporated communities in Kentucky